The Pisidian spring minnow (Pseudophoxinus fahrettini) is a species of cyprinid fish.
It is found in Köprü River drainage in central Anatolia in Turkey.

References

Pseudophoxinus
Taxa named by Jörg Freyhof
Endemic fauna of Turkey
Fish described in 2010